Once in a Blue Moon is an album by the University of Texas Jazz Orchestra that was released in 2000. It features Gary Foster on saxophone.

Background
This group that comprising the University of Texas Jazz Orchestra (during this time) is noted as one of the top collegiate jazz orchestras in the country having been invited to play at the 1997 International Association for Jazz Education Convention in Chicago. The group also played with James Moody, Manny Albam, Michael Brecker, Bobby Shew, and Jim McNeely in various concerts in this three-year period. Several members of the group have moved into teaching positions at major universities around the country and others are now established jazz artists.

Reception

Writing for All About Jazz, Jack Bowers said of the album that "...Ensemble work is bright and secure, soloists spry and resourceful, choice of material — much of it composed and / or arranged by UT students or alumni — uncommon but for the most part admirable..."

Track listing

Recording sessions
 Recorded 1996 and 1999 live and in studio at the University of Texas at Austin

Personnel

Musicians
 Conductor: Jeff Hellmer
 Alto saxophone (guest soloist): Gary Foster on "Ev'rything I Love"
 Saxes and woodwinds: Mace Hibbard, William Ferguson, Paul White, Dave Renter, David Box, Paul Haar, Colin Mason
 Trumpets and flugelhorns: Chip Crotts, Andy Cheetham, Warren Ealy, Rick White
 Trombones: Jerome Smith, Claudio Gariazzo, Thomas Lee, Wayne Myers, Bill Mann, Mike Hoffer
 Guitar: John Kregor
 Piano: Steve Snyder, Steven Termini
 Bass: Henry Lugo
 Drums: David Glover, Eric Middleton
 Percussion: Lisa Nicol

Production
 Recording/Mixing/Mastering engineer: Andy Murphy
 Liner notes: Jeff Hellmer
 Album design: Jodi Jenkins

References

External links 

 The University of Texas Jazz Orchestra

2000 albums
Jazz albums by American artists
Big band albums
Mainstream jazz albums